Orlando Villas-Bôas Regional Airport  is the airport serving Matupá, Brazil. The airport is named after the oldest of the Villas-Bôas brothers, Brazilian activists who in 1961 succeeded in getting the entire upper Xingu legally protected. This was the first and largest indigenous protected area in all South America and prototype for dozens of similar reserves in the continent.

Airlines and destinations
No scheduled flights operate at this airport.

Access

See also

List of airports in Brazil

References

External links

Airports in Mato Grosso